Blair Riley (born November 1, 1985) is a retired Canadian professional ice hockey forward who last played for the Cardiff Devils of the Elite Ice Hockey League (EIHL).

Playing career
Riley attended Ferris State University where he played NCAA Division I college hockey with the Ferris State Bulldogs men's ice hockey team. Following his graduation, Riley turned professional to join the Springfield Falcons for three games at the end of their 2009–10 AHL season.

On June 1, 2012, Riley was signed to his first NHL contract, agreeing to a one-year deal with the Bridgeport Sound Tigers affiliate, the New York Islanders.

On July 16, 2013, after not tendered a new contract with the Islanders, Riley signed as a free agent to a one-year AHL contract with the St. John's IceCaps. He established an AHL career high with 21 points in 71 games before serving as an Alternate captain in his second season with the club in 2014–15.

As a free agent, Riley signed a one-year contract with his sixth AHL team the Stockton Heat, an affiliate of the Calgary Flames, on September 4, 2015.

After 7 seasons within the AHL, Riley left North America as a free agent to sign a one-year deal with Northern Irish EIHL participant, the Belfast Giants on August 8, 2016. On July 6, 2019, Riley signed for Belfast's league rivals Cardiff Devils.

On October 7, 2020, Riley announced his retirement from hockey after 10 professional seasons.

Career statistics

References

External links

1985 births
Living people
Bridgeport Sound Tigers players
Belfast Giants players
Merritt Centennials players
Canadian ice hockey left wingers
Cardiff Devils players
Chicago Express players
Ferris State Bulldogs men's ice hockey players
Las Vegas Wranglers players
Nanaimo Clippers players
Peoria Rivermen (AHL) players
St. John's IceCaps players
San Antonio Rampage players
Springfield Falcons players
Stockton Heat players
Canadian expatriate ice hockey players in Northern Ireland
Canadian expatriate ice hockey players in Wales
Canadian expatriate ice hockey players in the United States